Otis Robert "Damon"  Harris Jr. (July 17, 1950 – February 18, 2013) was an American soul and R&B singer, most notable as a member of The Temptations from 1971 to 1975. Twenty years old when he joined the group, Harris was the youngest member of The Temptations during his tenure in the group. As a teenager Harris had formed a Temptations tribute band named The Young Tempts (a.k.a. The Young Vandals). The group had charted singles released on T-Neck Records, and later had a few minor hits under the name Impact. He also was instrumental in his former singing group partner, Billy Griffin, getting the opportunity to replace Smokey Robinson in The Miracles. Harris later founded, and became the CEO of, The Damon Harris Cancer Foundation dedicated to promoting the awareness, diagnosis, and treatment of prostate cancer.

Biography

The Young Tempts/The Young Vandals
As a teenager growing up in Baltimore, Maryland, Otis Harris Jr. was a major Temptations fan, and idolized in particular the group's falsetto, Eddie Kendricks. Patterning himself after Kendricks, Harris and his friends John Quinton Simms, Charles Timmons (also known as Kareem Ali, who went on to perform with Glenn Leonard's Temptations Revue), and Donald Knute Tighman, formed a Temptations-inspired vocal group during his high school years called The Young Tempts ("Tempts" being a nickname for the Temptations). The Young Tempts recorded covers of two 1966 Temptations' songs,  "I've Been Good to You" (a song originally recorded by The Miracles), and "Too Busy Thinking About My Baby," for The Isley Brothers' T-Neck Records in 1970. Motown Records filed an injunction against T-Neck because of the group's name; the 45 was withdrawn and re-issued with the group credited as The Young Vandals, and reached #46 on the R&B charts.

After two more T-Neck singles, " In My Opinion" and "I'm Gonna Wait For You", The Young Vandals broke up, because Harris felt that college would be a more sensible endeavor than a singing career.

The Temptations
In April 1971, a friend convinced Harris to audition for The Temptations, who were doing a series of shows in nearby Washington, D.C.. The group had just replaced Eddie Kendricks with Ricky Owens from The Vibrations, who was giving uneven performances, and The Temptations were again looking for a replacement. Harris performed first for Temptations Melvin Franklin, Richard Street, and Dennis Edwards before auditioning for group leader Otis Williams. Williams was hesitant about taking on the young singer, who was nearly a decade younger than the rest of The Temptations. Franklin, Street, and Edwards voted to accept Harris, however, and he made his onstage debut a few weeks later as first tenor/falsetto.

In 1973, Harris married Christina Combs of New York City. From that marriage two children were born, Otis Robert Harris III (Tre) and Dominique Chris-Ann Harris.

Harris continued to perform with the Temptations for four years, providing Kendricks-esque lead vocals on hits such as "Superstar (Remember How You Got Where You Are)" (1971), "Take a Look Around" (1972), the #1 pop hit "Papa Was a Rollin' Stone" (1972, a three-time Grammy Award winner), the #1 R&B hit "Masterpiece" (1973), and "Plastic Man" (1973). He sang lead on "Love Woke Me Up This Morning" from the All Directions album (1972) and is featured prominently on The Temptations Live in Japan (1973). According to Otis Williams's book The Temptations, Harris was fired from the group in 1975 because of inappropriate statements he made that affected the perception of the group in the eyes of the public.

New group
After leaving the group, the dejected Harris decided to reform The Young Vandals with Simms, Timmons (Kareem Ali), and Tilghman, renaming the group Impact, and signing a deal with Atco Records in 1976. Working with a Philadelphia soul production team, Impact recorded a number of minor soul and disco hits, including "Happy Man" and the #5 disco hit "Give a Broken Heart a Break". The group released only one album on Atco, 1976's Impact, before being dropped from the label because of low sales. Impact signed with Fantasy Records in 1977 and issued the album The Pac is Back, which also suffered from slow sales. The group disbanded and Harris recorded some solo singles of his own including 1978's "It's Music", and the album Silk.

Later years
Damon Harris soon retired from music and moved to Reno, Nevada to complete college. In the 1990s, he returned to music and began touring, sometimes billing himself as The Temptations Review Starring Damon Harris. Richard Street, another ex-Temptation, periodically performed with Harris' Temptations review until he formed his own Temptations group. He also briefly toured with former Temptations David Ruffin, Eddie Kendricks and Dennis Edwards before Ruffin and Kendricks died.

Illness, foundation and death
At the age of 47, Harris was diagnosed with prostate cancer, while making a comeback into the music industry. After being treated for the disease, Harris founded The Damon Harris Cancer Foundation in 2001. The organization is a non-profit company, designed to heighten awareness of prostate cancer diagnoses and treatments. The organization has a special focus in reaching Black audiences, as Black men have an approximately 60% higher chance of contracting prostate cancer than white men, and are twice as likely to die from the disease.

On Saturday May 5, 2001 South Jersey radio host Tim Marshall organized the first Damon Harris Cancer Foundation Benefit Gala held in Mount Laurel NJ.  Entertainers including Ms. Marilyn Marshall and The Delfonics  paid tribute to Harris who was honored for his charitable works.  Harris received a Proclamation from the New Jersey Legislature presented by State Senator Diane Allen. Harris was also a regular guest co-host on R&B Showcase Radio Show on WBZC FM in South Jersey.

Harris died at a Baltimore hospice February 18, 2013 of prostate cancer. He was 62.

Discography

Impact albums
 1976: Impact
 1977: The Pac is Back

Solo albums
 1978: Silk

References

External links

 Prostate Cancer Information and Support Website.
 Damon Harris biography
 Damon Harris Cancer Foundation Benefit-Archive Event

1950 births
2013 deaths
Musicians from Baltimore
American soul musicians
The Temptations members
American male singers
American tenors
African-American male singers
American soul singers
Deaths from prostate cancer
Deaths from cancer in Maryland